Tarkhany is a Writer's house museum in a Russian estate where the Romantic writer Mikhail Lermontov (1814–1841) spent his childhood and was buried. The late 18th Century–early 19th Century estate is located in the village of Lermontovo (formerly Tarkhany) in the Belinsky District of Penza Oblast. Tarkhany is the main tourist attraction of Penza Oblast.

Buildings
Manor house
Church of St. Mary of Egypt
The Human cottage (restored)
Steward's house (restored)
Arseniev Crypt and chapel
Countryside Church of the Archangel Michael
Lodge

The estate today
The estate is now the State Lermontov Museum — Tarkhany Reserve, created in 1939. It has an area of 485.3 acres. The museum register lists about 29,000 items, including 14,500 fixed assets. In the Steward's House, videos devoted to an atmosphere in which Lermontov lived as a child and scenes from Russian folk life are shown, as well as video expositions on two of his works - his poems Borodino and A Song about Tsar Ivan Vasilyevish, the Young Oprichnik, and the Valorous Merchant Kalashnikov (dedicated to the times of Ivan the Terrible).

Traditionally on the first weekend in July a Lermontov festival is held in Tarkhany, attended by prominent figures of Russian culture. During the festival special buses are run from Penza.

External links

 Worldwalk page on Church of St. Mary of Egypt (Tarkhany) 
 Official website of the Tarkhany Russian State Museum 
 Virtual tour of the estate 
 Photographs and other material about Tarkhany 

Museums in Penza Oblast
Mikhail Lermontov
Houses in Russia
Literary museums in Russia
Historic house museums in Russia
Poetry museums
Open-air museums in Russia
Cultural heritage monuments of federal significance in Penza Oblast